Children's National Hospital (formerly Children's National Health System, DC Children's Hospital, Children's National Medical Center) is a nationally ranked, freestanding, 323-bed, pediatric acute care children's hospital located in Washington D.C. It is affiliated with the George Washington University School of Medicine and the Howard University College of Medicine. The hospital provides comprehensive pediatric specialties and subspecialties to infants, children, teens, and young adults aged 0–21 throughout the region. The hospital features an ACS verified level I pediatric trauma center, the only one in the District of Columbia. Its pediatric intensive care unit and neonatal intensive care units serve the region. The hospital also has a rooftop helipad for critical pediatric transport.

Children's National is ranked among the best pediatric hospitals in the United States by U.S. News & World Report. In June 2022 the hospital was ranked as the #5 best children's hospital in the United States by U.S. News & World Report on the publications' honor roll list. The neonatology division was also ranked #1 in the country for the sixth year in a row.

Services and programs 

Division of Oncology: The Division of Oncology at Children's National Hospital strives to cure cancer and minimize the side effects of treatment. Children's National has access to Children's Oncology Group's Phase I trials and Pediatric Brain Tumor Consortium protocols.

Children's National Heart Institute: The institute is made up of the departments of Cardiology, Cardiac Surgery, Cardiac Intensive Care, and Cardiac Anesthesia. Cardiologists, cardiac surgeons, interventionalists, cardiac intensivists, anesthesiologists, and fetal heart specialists care for a wide range of congenital heart problems.

Children's National Division of Neurosurgery: The neurosurgery team tackles complex cases using image-guided surgery, gamma knife, and minimally invasive approaches. The Division of Neurology at Children's National treats a range of pediatric conditions, including autism, brain tumors, epilepsy, headaches, learning disabilities, migraines, movement disorders, neonatal neurology, neurogenetic diseases, neuromuscular diseases, stroke, and white matter diseases.

Children's National Neonatal Intensive Care Unit (NICU): The Division of Neonatology is ranked number one in the nation by U.S. News & World Report. Within this division is one of the only level IV NICUs in the Washington, D.C., area, providing care for premature and ill newborns.

Children's National Research Institute: Children's National Research Institute is a top ranked pediatric research institution in terms of overall National Institutes of Health (NIH) funding. Principal investigators and physicians work side by side.

Children's National Infectious Disease Division: The Division of Infectious Disease has renown physicians and fellows providing care to the area with Lyme disease, Zika, and other complicated infectious disease issues in the hospital. The division also contains a separate Transplant Infectious Disease division which cares for critically ill transplant patients including heart, bone marrow, kidney, and gastrointestinal tract. A partnership also exists with the National Institute of Allergy and Infectious Disease and ID division where internal medicine-pediatric infectious disease fellows rotate and collaborate with research projects.

Mobile giving campaign 
In July 2008, Children's National Hospital partnered with the Washington Nationals of Major League Baseball to promote the hospital's mobile giving campaign, which allows donations to be made via text message. In July 2009, Nick Jonas of the Jonas Brothers created a public service announcement encouraging people to support the diabetes program at Children's National Hospital.

The Night Before Christmas 
Annually, the First Lady visits the Hospital each December with Santa Claus to read the book "The Night Before Christmas". This convention has been maintained by First Ladies since Bess Truman.

Gender-affirming care harassment campaign 
On August 25, 2022, right-wing Twitter account Libs of TikTok published a recording of phone operators at the Children's National Hospital, who incorrectly suggested that a 16-year-old transgender boy could be eligible for a hysterectomy at the hospital's gender development clinic. One employee claimed that even younger patients are eligible for a hysterectomy. Right-wing media outlets, including Fox News and The Daily Caller, published articles about the recording. A spokeswoman for the hospital stated: "None of the people who were secretly recorded by this activist group deliver care to our patients. We do not and have never performed gender-affirming hysterectomies for anyone under the age of 18." The hospital's website, in error, had previously stated that hysterectomies were provided to patients "between the ages of 0-21". The hospital has received harassment and "a large volume of hostile and threatening phone calls and emails", as well as bomb threats. As of September 2, 2022, the recording has been viewed more than 1.1 million times on Twitter.

When contacted by The Washington Post, Raichik did not answer a question about whether she felt responsible for the threats made against the hospitals she tweeted about, including Children's National Hospital, but said that "we 100% condemn any acts/threats of violence".

See also 
Emergency Medical Services for Children

References

External links
Children's National Hospital Web Site
Children's National Hospital Foundation Web Site

Children's hospitals in the United States
Hospitals in Washington, D.C.
1870 establishments in Washington, D.C.
Children's National Hospital
Pediatric trauma centers